The Bahamas competed at the 2018 Commonwealth Games in the Gold Coast, Australia from April 4 to April 15, 2018. The Bahamas announced it will send a squad of 31 athletes. It was The Bahamas's 15th appearance at the Commonwealth Games.

Swimmer Joanna Evans was the island's flag bearer during the opening ceremony.

Medalists

Competitors
The following is the list of number of competitors participating at the Games per sport/discipline.

Athletics

The Bahamas announced a team of 19 athletes (12 men, 7 women) will compete at the 2018 Commonwealth Games.

Men
Track & road events

* Competed in heats only.

Field events

Women
Track & road events

Field events

Boxing

The Bahamas announced a team of 2 athletes (2 men) will compete at the 2018 Commonwealth Games.

Men

Cycling

The Bahamas announced a team of 2 athletes (2 men) will compete at the 2018 Commonwealth Games.

Road
Men

Swimming

The Bahamas announced a team of 4 athletes (2 men, 2 women) will compete at the 2018 Commonwealth Games.

Men

Women

Table tennis

The Bahamas announced a team of 1 athlete (1 man) will compete at the 2018 Commonwealth Games.

Triathlon

The Bahamas announced a team of 1 athlete (1 man) will compete at the 2018 Commonwealth Games.

Wrestling

Bahamas participated with 2 athletes (2 men).

Men

References

Nations at the 2018 Commonwealth Games
Bahamas at the Commonwealth Games
2018 in the Bahamas
2018 in Bahamian sport